The Aeroscout Scout B1-100 is a small Swiss unmanned helicopter drone developed for aerial mapping, surveillance, law enforcement and other roles.

Specifications

References

Notes

Bibliography

Scout B1100
2000s Swiss helicopters
Single-engined piston helicopters
Unmanned helicopters
Unmanned aerial vehicles of Switzerland